The 1983 World Cup took place 8–11 December 1983 at the Pondok Indah Golf and Country Club in Jakarta, Indonesia. It was the 30th World Cup event. The tournament was a 72-hole stroke play team event with 32 teams (of which Germany withdrew from the competition). Each team consisted of two players from a country. The combined score of each team determined the team results. The United States team of Rex Caldwell and John Cook won by seven strokes over the Australia team of Terry Gale and Wayne Grady and Canada team of Dave Barr and Jerry Anderson The individual competition for The International Trophy, was won by Dave Barr three strokes ahead of Rex Caldwell.

Teams

Scores
Team

International Trophy

Peter Fowler was invited to play in the individual competition for The International Trophy, out of the team competition.

Sources:

References

World Cup (men's golf)
Golf tournaments in Indonesia
Sport in Jakarta
World Cup
World Cup